The 2010 Idol Star Championships in Athletics (Hangul: 아이돌스타 육상 선수권 대회) was held at Mokdong Stadium in Seoul, South Korea on September 14, 2010   and was broadcast on MBC from September 25 to 26, 2010. At the championships a total number of 10 events in athletics were contested: 5 by men and 5 by women. There were a total number of 130 participating K-pop singers and celebrities from 15 management companies, divided into 16 teams.

Results

Men

Women

Ratings

Notes

References

MBC TV original programming
South Korean variety television shows
South Korean game shows
2010 in South Korean television
Idol Star Athletics Championships